Henry Lascelles may refer to:
Henry Lascelles (1690–1753), English-born Barbados plantation owner, director of the British East India Company, and MP for Northallerton
Henry Lascelles, 2nd Earl of Harewood (1767–1841), known as Viscount Lascelles from 1814 to 1820, British peer and Member of Parliament
Henry Lascelles, 3rd Earl of Harewood (1797–1857), known as Viscount Lascelles from 1820 to 1841, British peer and Member of Parliament
Henry Lascelles, 4th Earl of Harewood (1824–1892), British peer and son of Henry Lascelles, 3rd Earl of Harewood
Henry Lascelles, 5th Earl of Harewood (1846–1929), British peer and son of Henry Lascelles, 4th Earl of Harewood
Henry Lascelles, 6th Earl of Harewood (1882–1947), styled The Hon. Henry Lascelles & Viscount Lascelles, son of 5th Earl of Harewood